Polyxena was a Trojan princess at the time of the Trojan War.

Polyxena can also refer to:

People
 Polyxena, a 1st-century Christian saint, see Acts of Xanthippe, Polyxena, and Rebecca
 Polyxena of Hesse-Rotenburg, queen consort of Sardinia, mother of King Victor Amadeus III of Sardinia
 Polyxena of Lobkowicz, a Czech noblewoman
 Henrietta Polyxena of Vasaborg, a Swedish countess
 Polissena Contarini Da Mula, dogaressa of Venice
 Polissena Ruffo (1400-1420), an Italian noblewoman
 Polissena Sforza (1428-1449), an Italian noblewoman
 Polissena of San Macario (d. 1571), an Italian woman accused of witchcraft

Creative works
 Polyxena sarcophagus, a classical work of art
 The Sacrifice of Polyxena (Charles Le Brun), a painting
 The Sacrifice of Polyxena (Giovanni Francesco Romanelli), a painting
 Polyxène et Pirrhus, an opera

Scientific

 Acmosara polyxena a species of moth
 Paranerita polyxena, a species of moth
 Pseudocatharylla polyxena, a species of moth
 Zerynthia polyxena, a species of butterfly
 Polyxena, a synonym of Cordyla a genus of gnat

 Polyxena, a synonym of Lachenalia a plant genus
 595 Polyxena, an asteroid